Walnut Grove, Indiana, may refer to:

 Walnut Grove, Hamilton County, Indiana
 Walnut Grove, Warren County, Indiana